Sugarloaf is a rural locality in the Southern Downs Region, Queensland, Australia.

Sugarloaf is on the border with New South Wales.

Geography 
The locality is bounded to the north and east by the Great Dividing Range which also marks the border with New South Wales.

A number of creeks rise on the slopes of the Great Dividing Range and flow in a general south-west direction becoming directly or indirectly tributaries to Quart Pot Creek.

The land use is predominantly grazing on native vegetation with some plantation forestry and irrigated cropping.

History 

The district developed as a mining area as many of the creeks were a source of tin.

In May 1873, there were many men working in the tin mines and there was an urgent need for a school for the "hundreds of children" living in the area. The St Leonard's Tin Mine donated  of land for the school and the residents raised £80 to contribute to its establishment. By 27 May 1874, the school building was "nearly finished". Sugarloaf State School opened on 5 August 1874. It closed in 1939. It was at 1061 Sugarloaf Road.

St Patrick's Catholic Church opened in 1910 between April and August. In 1964, it was relocated to Amiens.

Economy 
There are a number of homesteads in the locality, including:

 Glen Robins
 Hillview
 Sugarloaf

Education 
There are no schools in Sugarloaf. The nearest government primary school is Stanthorpe State School and the nearest government secondary school is Stanthorpe State High School, both of which are in Stanthorpe to the north-west.

Facilities 
Sugarloaf Rural Fire Station is on the southern corner of Sugarloaf Road and Nielsens Road.

References 

Southern Downs Region
Localities in Queensland